The 2019 WNBA season was the 21st season for the Connecticut Sun franchise of the WNBA. It was also the 17th season for the franchise in Connecticut. The team opened the season on May 25 versus the Washington Mystics.

The Sun started the season well, posting a 9–4 record through the end of June.  They were especially strong at home, going 6–0 over the first two months of the season.  The end of June into the beginning of July proved to be a rough patch for the team.  They lost five straight games from June 23 to July 10.  This stretch included one of only two home losses on the season.  After this losing streak, the Sun went on a seven game winning streak that lasted from July 12 to August 4.  The Sun's final record in July was 5–2.  The Sun didn't lose in August and posted an 8–3 record.  The Sun's other home loss came on September 6 as the team closed out the season 1–2 in September.  The Sun clinched a playoff berth on August 18, and their final 23–11 record earned them the second seed in the playoffs.

As the second seed, the Sun earned a bye through to the Semifinals.  There, they met the #3 seed Los Angeles Sparks.  The Sun proved to be too much for the Sparks, sweeping them three games to none.  They advanced to the finals where they faced off against the #1 seed Washington Mystics.  In a tightly contested finals, the Sun ultimately came up short, losing two games to three.

Transactions

WNBA Draft

The Sun made the following selections in the 2019 WNBA Draft.

Trades/Roster Changes

Current roster

Game log

Preseason 

|- style="background:#bbffbb;"
| 1
| May 13
| New York Liberty
| W 100–66
| J. Jones (19)
| J. Thomas (7)
| Williams (7)
| Mohegan Sun Arena3,806
| 1–0
|- style="background:#fcc;"
| 2
| May 14
| Dallas Wings
| L 67–71
| Holmes (14)
| J. Jones (14)
| Stricklen (4)
| Mohegan Sun Arena3,965
| 1–1
|- style="background:#bbffbb;"
| 3
| May 19
| vs. New York Liberty
| W 98–79
| J. Jones (21)
| Williams (5)
| Williams (5)
| Times Union Center
| 2–1

Regular season

|- style="background:#bbffbb;"
| 1
| May 25
| Washington Mystics
| W 84–69
| A. Thomas (23)
| J. Jones (14)
| J. Thomas (6)
| Mohegan Sun Arena7,913
| 1–0
|- style="background:#bbffbb;"
| 2
| May 28
| Indiana Fever
| W 88–77
| J. Jones (25)
| A. Thomas (10)
| J. Thomas (7)
| Mohegan Sun Arena4,781
| 2–0
|- style="background:#fcc;"
| 3
| May 31
| @ Los Angeles Sparks
| L 70–77
| J. Jones (16)
| J. Jones (22)
| Clarendon (3)
| Staples Center12,334
| 2–1

|- style="background:#bbffbb;"
| 4
| June 2
| @ Las Vegas Aces
| W 80–74
| Williams (19)
| J. Jones (13)
| Tied (5)
| Mandalay Bay Events Center2,747
| 3–1
|- style="background:#bbffbb;"
| 5
| June 6
| Los Angeles Sparks
| W 89–77
| J. Jones (18)
| A. Thomas (12)
| A. Thomas (6)
| Mohegan Sun Arena5,496
| 4–1
|- style="background:#bbffbb;"
| 6
| June 9
| @ Atlanta Dream
| W 65–59
| J. Jones (17)
| J. Jones (13)
| J. Thomas (6)
| State Farm Arena3,082
| 5–1
|- style="background:#bbffbb;"
| 7
| June 11
| Washington Mystics
| W 83–75
| J. Jones (24)
| A. Thomas (12)
| J. Thomas (6)
| Mohegan Sun Arena5,224
| 6–1
|- style="background:#bbffbb;"
| 8
| June 14
| @ Minnesota Lynx
| W 85–81
| 3 tied (16)
| J. Jones (12)
| Williams (6)
| Target Center8,803
| 7–1
|- style="background:#bbffbb;"
| 9
| June 16
| Seattle Storm
| W 81–67
| A. Thomas (20)
| J. Jones (11)
| J. Jones (6)
| Mohegan Sun Arena7,773
| 8–1
|- style="background:#bbffbb;"
| 10
| June 21
| Atlanta Dream
| W 86–76
| Stricklen (24)
| J. Jones (8)
| J. Thomas (9)
| Mohegan Sun Arena6,608
| 9–1
|- style="background:#fcc;"
| 11
| June 23
| @ Chicago Sky
| L 75–93
| A. Thomas (13)
| J. Jones (10)
| J. Thomas (7)
| Wintrust Arena5,607
| 9–2
|- style="background:#fcc;"
| 12
| June 26
| @ Dallas Wings
| L 73–74
| A. Thomas (28)
| Williams (7)
| J. Thomas (11)
| College Park Center4,017
| 9–3
|- style="background:#fcc;"
| 13
| June 29
| @ Washington Mystics
| L 59–102
| J. Jones (15)
| J. Jones (7)
| J. Thomas (5)
| St. Elizabeth's East Arena4,200
| 9–4

|- style="background:#fcc;"
| 14
| July 6
| Minnesota Lynx
| L 71–74
| J. Thomas (16)
| Tied (9)
| J. Thomas (5)
| Mohegan Sun Arena8,076
| 9–5
|- style="background:#fcc;"
| 15
| July 10
| @ Atlanta Dream
| L 75–78
| Williams (13)
| Tied (9)
| 6 tied (2)
| State Farm Arena3,866
| 9–6
|- style="background:#bbffbb;"
| 16
| July 12
| Phoenix Mercury
| W 79–64
| A. Thomas (20)
| J. Jones (11)
| J. Thomas (8)
| Mohegan Sun Arena6,864
| 10–6
|- style="background:#bbffbb;"
| 17
| July 14
| @ Indiana Fever
| W 76–63
| J. Jones (26)
| J. Jones (8)
| J. Thomas (6)
| Bankers Life Fieldhouse6,434
| 11–6
|- style="background:#bbffbb;"
| 18
| July 19
| Atlanta Dream
| W 98–69
| Holmes (17)
| J. Jones (9)
| Williams (5)
| Mohegan Sun Arena6,733
| 12–6
|- style="background:#bbffbb;"
| 19
| July 24
| New York Liberty
| W 70–63
| J. Thomas (18)
| A. Thomas (12)
| J. Thomas (7)
| Mohegan Sun Arena8,249
| 13–6
|- style="background:#bbffbb;"
| 20
| July 30
| Chicago Sky
| W 100–94
| J. Jones (27)
| J. Jones (11)
| J. Thomas (8)
| Mohegan Sun Arena6,358
| 14–6

|- style="background:#bbffbb;"
| 21
| August 1
| Phoenix Mercury
| W 68–62
| J. Jones (15)
| J. Jones (14)
| Williams (5)
| Mohegan Sun Arena6,014
| 15–6
|- style="background:#bbffbb;"
| 22
| August 4
| @ New York Liberty
| W 94–79
| Williams (28)
| J. Jones (10)
| Williams (6)
| Westchester County Center1,927
| 16–6
|- style="background:#fcc;"
| 23
| August 9
| @ Minnesota Lynx
| L 57–89
| Holmes (10)
| A. Thomas (7)
| 3 tied (2)
| Target Center8,892
| 16–7
|- style="background:#fcc;"
| 24
| August 11
| @ Las Vegas Aces
| L 81–89
| Williams (13)
| J. Jones (12)
| Tied (4)
| Mandalay Bay Events Center4,633
| 16–8
|- style="background:#bbffbb;"
| 25
| August 14
| @ Phoenix Mercury
| W 78–71
| J. Thomas (18)
| J. Jones (14)
| Tied (4)
| Talking Stick Resort Arena8,734
| 17–8
|- style="background:#bbffbb;"
| 26
| August 16
| Seattle Storm
| W 79–78
| Stricklen (24)
| A. Thomas (11)
| J. Thomas (7)
| Mohegan Sun Arena7,092
| 18–8
|- style="background:#bbffbb;"
| 27
| August 18
| Dallas Wings
| W 78–68
| Williams (18)
| J. Jones (10)
| J. Thomas (9)
| Mohegan Sun Arena7,275
| 19–8
|- style="background:#bbffbb;"
| 28
| August 23
| Las Vegas Aces
| W 89–85
| A. Thomas (27)
| A. Thomas (12)
| J. Thomas (8)
| Mohegan Sun Arena7,483
| 20–8
|- style="background:#fcc;"
| 29
| August 25
| @ Los Angeles Sparks
| L 72–84
| Williams (18)
| J. Jones (12)
| Tied (5)
| Staples Center17,076
| 20–9
|- style="background:#bbffbb;"
| 30
| August 27
| @ Seattle Storm
| W 89–70
| A. Thomas (22)
| A. Thomas (11)
| Tied (4)
| Alaska Airlines Arena6,258
| 21–9
|- style="background:#bbffbb;"
| 31
| August 30
| @ New York Liberty
| W 94–84
| Williams (26)
| A. Thomas (9)
| J. Thomas (7)
| Westchester County Center1,791
| 22–9

|- style="background:#bbffbb;"
| 32
| September 4
| Dallas Wings
| W 102–72
| J. Jones (22)
| Williams (8)
| Hiedeman (9)
| Mohegan Sun Arena6,284
| 23-9
|- style="background:#fcc;"
| 33
| September 6
| Chicago Sky
| L 104–109
| Williams (25)
| Tied (9)
| Williams (9)
| Mohegan Sun Arena8,077
| 23–10
|- style="background:#fcc;"
| 34
| September 8
| @ Indiana Fever
| L 76–104
| B. Jones (14)
| B. Jones (10)
| Williams (4)
| Bankers Life Fieldhouse5,451
| 23–11

Playoffs

|- style="background:#bbffbb;"
| 1
| September 17
| Los Angeles Sparks
| W 84–75
| A. Thomas (22)
| A. Thomas (10)
| J. Thomas (8)
| Mohegan Sun Arena7,102
| 1–0
|- style="background:#bbffbb;"
| 2
| September 19
| Los Angeles Sparks
| W 94–68
| J. Jones (27)
| Tied (13)
| J. Thomas (7)
| Mohegan Sun Arena8,051
| 2–0
|- style="background:#bbffbb;"
| 3
| September 22
| @ Los Angeles Sparks
| W 78–56
| J. Thomas (29)
| Williams (13)
| A. Thomas (6)
| Walter Pyramid4,000
| 3–0

|- style="background:#fcc;"
| 1
| September 29
| @ Washington Mystics
| L 86–95
| Williams (26)
| Tied (6)
| A. Thomas (6)
| St. Elizabeth's East Arena4,200
| 0–1
|- style="background:#bbffbb;"
| 2
| October 1
| @ Washington Mystics
| W 99–87
| J. Jones (32)
| J. Jones (18)
| Tied (6)
| St. Elizabeth's East Arena4,200
| 1–1
|- style="background:#fcc;"
| 3
| October 6
| Washington Mystics
| L 81–94
| Tied (16)
| J. Jones (9)
| A. Thomas (9)
| Mohegan Sun Arena9,170
| 1–2
|- style="background:#bbffbb;"
| 4
| October 8
| Washington Mystics
| W 90–86
| J. Jones (18)
| J. Jones (13)
| A. Thomas (11)
| Mohegan Sun Arena8,458
| 2–2
|- style="background:#fcc;"
| 5
| October 10
| @ Washington Mystics
| L 78–89
| J. Jones (25)
| A. Thomas (12)
| Tied (6)
| St. Elizabeth's East Arena4,200
| 2–3

Standings

Playoffs

Statistics

Regular season

Awards and honors

References

External links
The Official Site of the Connecticut Sun

Connecticut Sun seasons
Connecticut Sun
2019 in sports in Connecticut
Events in Uncasville, Connecticut